Wysocko may refer to the following places in Poland:
Wysocko, Lower Silesian Voivodeship (south-west Poland)
Wysocko, Subcarpathian Voivodeship (south-east Poland)
Wysocko, Masovian Voivodeship (east-central Poland)